Rajeshwara Patel  (born 5 July 1911, date of death unknown) was an Indian politician. He was elected to the Lok Sabha, the lower house of the Parliament of India from the Hajipur in Bihar as a member of the Indian National Congress.

References

External links
Official biographical sketch in Lok Sabha website

1911 births
Year of death missing
India MPs 1952–1957
India MPs 1957–1962
India MPs 1962–1967
Indian National Congress politicians
Lok Sabha members from Bihar